For Love is Anuhea Jenkins' second album. It was released on February 12, 2012.

Track listing

"Looking for Love" – 3:21
"Higher Than the Clouds" – 3:43
"Simple Love Song" – 3:44
"Mr. Mellow" – 3:32
"Moving On" – 3:36
"I Wanna Be There" – 4:08
"Fight for Me Tonight" – 3:38
"It's Not the Same" – 3:12
"No Time" – 3:33
"Come Over Love" – 4:05
"Crown Royal" – 3:58
"What Am I Doing? - 3:52
"Sunday" – 4:23
"Issues" -

References

2012 albums
Anuhea Jenkins albums